Christopher Boehm (1931–2021) was an American  cultural anthropologist with a subspecialty in primatology, who researched conflict resolution, altruism, the evolution of morality, and feuding and warfare. He was also the Director of the Jane Goodall Research Center at University of Southern California, a multi-media interactive database focusing on the social and moral behavior of world hunter gatherers. Boehm died on November 23, 2021 at the age of 90.

Education 
Boehm received his Ph.D. in social anthropology from Harvard University in 1972, and was later trained in ethological field techniques (1983).

Work 
Boehm did field work with human societies such as the Navajo People and the Rovca  Tribes of Montenegro or Upper Morača River Tribe, as well as primates such as wild chimpanzees, focusing on questions of morality in an evolutionary context.

After analyzing data from 48 human societies spread across the globe, ranging from small hunting and gathering bands to more sedentary chiefdoms, Boehm suggested that all human societies likely practiced egalitarianism before the domestication plants and animals, and that most of the time they did so very successfully.

Boehm wrote:

 "As long as followers remain vigilantly egalitarian because they understand the nature of domination and leaders remain cognizant of this ambivalence-based vigilance, deliberate control of leaders may remain for the most part highly routinized and ethnographically unobvious."

Boehm identified the following mechanisms ensuring the what he called a "Reverse Dominance Hierarchy": Public Opinion, Criticism and Ridicule, Disobedience, and Extreme Sanctions. Further characteristics include ambivalence towards leaders and anticipation of domination.

Awards 
Boehm won the Stirling Prize in Psychological Anthropology, and was a recipient of a John Simon Guggenheim Fellowship and a fellowship at the School of Advanced Research in Santa Fe, New Mexico.

Publications

Bibliography 
 
 
 
 
 Boehm, C. (1986). Blood Revenge: The Enactment and Management of Conflict in Montenegro and Other Tribal Societies. Philadelphia: University of Pennsylvania Press. [1984 book reprinted with revisions and new title].
 Boehm, C. (1984). Blood Revenge: The Anthropology of Feuding in Montenegro and Other Nonliterate Societies. Lawrence: University Press of Kansas.
 Boehm, C. (1983). Montenegrin Social Organization and Values: Political Ethnography of a Refuge Area Tribal Adaptation. New York: AMS Press.

See also
 Evolution of morality
 Political anthropology
 Primatology
 Evolutionary anthropology
 Evolutionary psychology
 Sociobiology

References 

Harvard Graduate School of Arts and Sciences alumni
American anthropologists
University of Southern California faculty
1931 births
2021 deaths